Nitin Chauhaan (born 11 November 1988) is an Indian television actor and model. He is winner of TV reality show Dadagiri (season 2)  and participated in the reality television show MTV Splitsvilla 5.  He also appeared in the Zindagi Dot Com.

Television

References

Living people
People from Delhi
1988 births
Indian male models
Indian male television actors
Male actors in Hindi cinema